Beaver Dam State Park is a public recreation area encompassing more than  along Beaver Dam Wash in Lincoln County, Nevada.

History
Beaver Dam State Park was among the first four state parks established when the state park system was created by the Nevada Legislature in 1935. The Civilian Conservation Corps was active from 1934 to 1936 building camping and picnicking areas that were destroyed by floods later in the 1930s. Schroeder Reservoir was created with the construction of an earthen dam in 1961. After Schroeder Lake was washed out by flood in 2005, the reservoir was not rebuilt. In 2009, the reservoir was drained and Beaver Dam Wash was restored to its natural state.

Activities and amenities
The park has picnicking facilities, campgrounds, trout fishing in beaver ponds and streams, and hiking trails. The Overlook Trail offers a 360° view of the park.

References

External links
Beaver Dam State Park Nevada State Parks
Beaver Dam State Park Trail Map Nevada State Parks

Protected areas of Lincoln County, Nevada
State parks of Nevada
Protected areas established in 1935
1935 establishments in Nevada
Civilian Conservation Corps in Nevada